"Expanding Human" is an episode of the original The Outer Limits television show, first broadcast on 10 October 1964, during the second season.

Control voice (shortened intro)

Introduction
A man experiments with consciousness expanding drugs and accidentally lets loose the monster inside himself.

Opening narration
As far back as men have recorded their history, veils have been lowered to disclose a vast new reality –rents in the fabric of Man's awareness. And somewhere, in the endless search of the curious mind, lies the next vision, the next key to his infinite capacity...

Plot
Professor Peter Wayne is disturbed to hear that his university colleague, Dr. Roy Clinton, is pursuing forbidden drug experiments with a group of graduate students.  When one of the students turns up dead, Professor Wayne investigates Clinton's activities.  He discovers that consciousness-expansion can have powerful and dangerous consequences.

Closing narration
Some success, some failure, but either way the gnawing hunger to know is never sated, and the road to the unknown continues to be dark and strange.

Cast

(Homeier, Doohan, Andes, Wingreen and Duryea all appeared in Star Trek: The Original Series)

External links
 

The Outer Limits (1963 TV series season 2) episodes
1964 American television episodes
Television episodes directed by Gerd Oswald